The 2003 SEC Championship Game was won by the LSU Tigers 34–13 over the Georgia Bulldogs. The game was played in the Georgia Dome in Atlanta, Georgia.

References

External links
Recap of the game at ESPN.com
Story at LSUSports.net 

SEC Championship
SEC Championship Game
Georgia Bulldogs football games
LSU Tigers football games
December 2003 sports events in the United States
2003 in sports in Georgia (U.S. state)
2003 in Atlanta